Four Roads Junction is a settlement on the island of Saint Lucia; it is located at the northern end of the island towards its heart, near Ti Rocher, Dubrassay, and Trois Pitons.

References

Towns in Saint Lucia